Murdoch McKenzie may refer to:
 Murdoch Mackenzie (cartographer) (1712–1797), Scottish hydrographer and cartographer
 Murdoch MacKenzie (1600–1688),  Scottish minister and prelate
 Murdoch McKenzie (footballer), Scottish footballer

See also
 Murdoch McKenzie Wood (1881–1949), Scottish politician
 Murdoch or Murdo MacKenzie (courtier) (died 1590), builder of Fairburn Tower